Michaela Boyle (born 29 September 1966) is a Sinn Féin politician in Northern Ireland.  She was elected to the Northern Ireland Assembly in 2011 as a Member of the Legislative Assembly (MLA). She was re-elected in 2016 and 2017 She was co-opted to Strabane District Council in 2008.

Boyle was elected to Derry City and Strabane District Council at the local elections on 2 May 2019. She was elected as Mayor of the Council at its first sitting following the council election. She then resigned her Assembly seat, and Maolíosa McHugh was co-opted to the Assembly in her place.

References

External links
Link to profile on Northern Ireland Assembly website

1966 births
Living people
Sinn Féin MLAs
Members of Strabane District Council
Northern Ireland MLAs 2011–2016
Northern Ireland MLAs 2016–2017
Northern Ireland MLAs 2017–2022
Female members of the Northern Ireland Assembly
Sinn Féin councillors in Northern Ireland
Members of Derry City and Strabane District Council
Women councillors in Northern Ireland